Kornilovskaya may refer to:

Kornilovskaya, a village in Arkhangelsk Oblast, Russia
Kornilovskaya, a Moscow Metro station